Queen Dong (17 October 1623 – 30 July 1681), birth name Dong You, posthumous name Chaowu Wangfei, was the princess consort of Koxinga and mother of Zheng Jing.

Biography 

In 1623, Dong was born in a Jinjiang family with scholar-official, and her father was Dong Yangxian, a politician of Southern Ming. In 1642, Dong married Koxinga and gave birth to Zheng Jing. In 1649, Koxinga became Prince of Yanping; as the result, Dong became his princess consort. In 1662, Koxinga defeated Frederick Coyett and his army in the Siege of Fort Zeelandia, and Kingdom of Tungning was later built. After Koxinga died, Dong's son Zheng Jing won the succession to the throne of Tungning by defeating Zheng Xi in a civil war and Zheng Tai in a political struggle. In 1681, Dong died in Tainan, Taiwan.

Family

Royal of Tungning

Dong's descendants 
Zheng Jing (Prince Wen of Chao & Prince of Yanping)
Zheng Kezang (Crown prince of Yanping & regency)
Zheng Keshuang (Prince of Chao & Prince of Yanping)
Zheng Cong (prince)
Zheng Ming (prince)
Zheng Rui (prince)
Zheng Zhi (prince)

Dong's family 
Dong Ciqiao (grandfather)
Dong Yangbin (uncle)
Dong Yangxian (father)
Dong Yin (brother)
Dong Lin (brother)
Dong Kui (brother)
Dong Ju (brother)
Dong Wu (brother)
Dong Yin (sister)
Dong Zhou (sister)
Dong Qian (sister)
Dong Yangyu (uncle)

References

Further reading 
 Koxinga

House of Koxinga
Dong You
Dong You
Kingdom of Tungning
Taiwanese people of Tungning